Hunterstown Historic District is a national historic district located at Hunterstown, Straban Township in Adams County, Pennsylvania. The district includes 48 contributing buildings within the original perimeters of Hunterstown.  They primarily date from the late 18th to the mid-19th century and consists of log, frame, and brick residential buildings and a farm complex.  Located in the district is the separately listed Great Conewago Presbyterian Church.

It was listed on the National Register of Historic Places in 1979.

References 

Historic districts on the National Register of Historic Places in Pennsylvania
Historic districts in Adams County, Pennsylvania
National Register of Historic Places in Adams County, Pennsylvania